Australian Women's Party may refer to:
Australian Women's Party (1995)
Australian Women's Party (2015)